This is a list of media in the city of Owen Sound in Southwestern Ontario, Canada.

Radio

Television
The Owen Sound area is not designated as a mandatory market for digital television conversion. All broadcasting stations except CIII-DT 4 are analogue repeaters of stations based elsewhere.

 Channel 2: CKCO-TV-2 - CTV Television Network - (Transmitter at Wiarton, Ontario and an analogue rebroadcaster of CKCO-DT 13 from Kitchener, Ontario) (Since 2014 no longer in operation as only 35 residents complained when it was off the air due to technical difficulties.)
 Channel 4.1: CIII-TV-4, Global Television Network
 Channel 8: CKNX-TV, CTV 2 (repeater of CFPL-DT London)
 Channel 52: Rogers TV Grey County is headquartered in Owen Sound on 20th St. E.

Print
Owen Sound Sun Times

Owen Sound

Media, Owen Sound